The 2010 Men's South American Volleyball Club Championship was the second official edition of the men's volleyball tournament, played by six teams over October 26 – November 1, 2010 in República de Venezuela Complex in Bolivar and Aldo Cantoni Colliseum in San Juan, Argentina. The winning team qualified for the 2010 FIVB Men's Club World Championship.

The competition was originally scheduled from October 26–30 but due to the national mourning due to the death of Argentinean ex-president Néstor Kirchner, had to be re-scheduled.

Competing clubs

First round

Pool A

|}

|}

Pool B

|}

|}

Championship Round

Semifinals

|}

Bronze medal match

|}

Gold medal match

|}

Final standing

Team Roster:
Sebastián Solé,
Gabriel Arroyo(C),			
Federico Pereyra,	
Iván Castellani,
Lucas Ocampo,	
Pablo Meana(L),	
Jean Carlo Badalotti,
Javier Filardi,
Franco Giachetta,	
Nicolás Méndez,	
Edgardo Lioca,	
Luciano De Cecco,

Head Coach: Martín Weber

Individual awards

Most Valuable Player
 Luciano de Cecco (Drean Bolivar)
Best Spiker
 Lucas Ocampo (Drean Bolivar)
Best Blocker
 Eder Carbonera (Cimed Florianópolis)
Best Server
 Lucas Ocampo (Drean Bolivar)

Best Digger
 Jean Carlo Badalotti (Drean Bolivar)
Best Setter
 Luciano de Cecco (Drean Bolivar)
Best Receiver
 Thales Hoss (Cimed Florianópolis)
Best Libero
 Thales Hoss (Cimed Florianópolis)

References

2010 in volleyball
2010 in Argentine sport
2010
International volleyball competitions hosted by Argentina